Gary Johnson (born 24 April 1984 in Farnborough, London, England) is a Rugby Union player for Cornish Pirates RFC in the Aviva Championship, playing primarily as a Lock. He previously played for London Irish for 10 seasons.

Johnson made his London Irish debut against London Wasps, in the 2006–07 EDF Energy Cup.

Johnson played in the final of the 2008–09 Guinness Premiership at Twickenham, as London Irish were defeated by the Leicester Tigers.

References

External links
London Irish profile
Guinness Premiership profile
Cornish Pirates profile

1984 births
Living people
English rugby union players
People from Farnborough, London
London Irish players
London Welsh RFC players
Cornish Pirates players
Rugby union locks
Rugby union players from Greater London